The Visitor is an American science fiction television series created by Roland Emmerich and Dean Devlin which aired on Fox from September 19, 1997 to January 16, 1998. It starred John Corbett as Adam McArthur who was abducted by extraterrestrials 50 years earlier and escapes back to Earth to help improve life for humanity.

The series was created in parallel with the world's first webshows, the now defunct Thevisitor.com, which featured alternate characters, interweaving storylines and early use of DHTML animation. The premise of The Visitor is similar to the 2004 television series The 4400.

Overview
Fifty years prior to the outset of the show Adam MacArthur is abducted by aliens in the Bermuda Triangle during World War II. Upon his escape and subsequent return to Earth, he finds that not only is he still the young man he was 50 years before, but he also has special powers. During his abduction, aliens managed to tap into a largely unused portion of his brain which left Adam with the power to heal and bring people back to life. He also acquired several other strange abilities.

In the series, he claims that all people have the power to do this but simply don't know how. Most episodes see Adam travelling America and making the lives of people better by using both his deductive reasoning and his special powers. He's driven by what he feels to be a quest to change the lives of strangers.

Adam used a small ship to travel back to Earth and continues to use the ship for travel purposes employing a device the size of a television remote to control it. When not in use, Adam usually hides his ship from view.

A Colonel from the U.S. Army, James Vise, is concerned about Adam's presence on Earth. He spends most episodes attempting to capture what he perceives to be a threat to U.S. security. FBI agents Wilcox, Larue and Van Patten are also after Adam; however, they don't see him as a threat, but rather want to question him about his disappearance. They often clash with Vise's group. Adam is also being chased by otherworldly forces. Apparently, the aliens abducted a few humans as part of an experiment; Adam being one of them. Since Adam's escape back to Earth, the aliens are attempting to track him down in order to resume their tests.

In the end, Adam convinces his "abductors" that he has a mission to complete on Earth and thus is given the opportunity to save mankind. Vise, who was killed during his struggle to capture Adam, is revived by the one who he saw as a threat and is saved by him. Adam convinces him to find another purpose in his second chance in life. However, the ending is somewhat open because after Vise's "death", new questions rise. In addition, FBI agents Wilcox, Larue and Van Patten are reassigned (or forced to resign) after the trio's encounter with Adam and Vise.

As a show where the main character is travelling to different locations in each episode, the show doesn't feature a large cast of primary characters. Similarly to shows like The X-Files, most episodes feature a supporting cast that appears for just a single episode.

Characters

 Adam MacArthur (played by John Corbett)
 Agent Douglas Wilcox (Grand L. Bush)
 Agent Nicholas LaRue (Leon Rippy)
 Agent Craig Van Patten (John Storey)	
 Colonel James Vise (Steve Railsback)

Episodes

External links

 TheVisitor.com on Wayback Machine

References

Fox Broadcasting Company original programming
Television series by 20th Century Fox Television
1990s American science fiction television series
1997 American television series debuts
1998 American television series endings